A ring chromosome is an aberrant chromosome whose ends have fused together to form a ring. Ring chromosomes were first discovered by Lilian Vaughan Morgan in 1926. A ring chromosome is denoted by the symbol r in human genetics and R in Drosophila genetics. Ring chromosomes may form in cells following genetic damage by mutagens like radiation, but they may also arise spontaneously during development.

Formation

In order for a chromosome to form a ring, both ends of the chromosome are usually missing, enabling the broken ends to fuse together. In rare cases, the telomeres at the ends of a chromosome fuse without any loss of genetic material, which results in a normal phenotype.

Complex rearrangements, including segmental microdeletions and microduplications, have been seen in numerous ring chromosomes, providing important clues regarding the mechanisms of their formation.

Small supernumerary rings can also form, resulting in a partial trisomy.

Ring chromosomes are unstable during cell division and can form interlocking or fused rings.

Associated syndromes
Human genetic disorders can be caused by ring chromosome formation. Although ring chromosomes are very rare, they have been found in all human chromosomes. Symptoms seen in patients carrying ring chromosomes are more likely to be caused by the deletion of genes in the telomeric regions of affected chromosomes, rather than by the formation of a ring structure itself. Almost all ring chromosome syndromes feature marked growth delay.

Ring chromosomes can be inherited or sporadic. Mosaicism is common and affects the severity of the condition. Location of fusion also affects severity due to loss of differing amounts of genetic material from the ends of chromosomes.

Disorders arising from the formation of a ring chromosome include:

See also
 Chromosome abnormalities

References

External links
 Atlas of Genetics and Cytogenetics in Oncology and Haematology, explains HOW the ring formation causes abnormalities.

Ring chromosomes